The Gsieser-Tal-Lauf (Italian: Gran Fondo Val Casies) is a cross-country skiing race that takes place every year on the third weekend in February in the Gsiesertal in South Tyrol, Italy. It is the largest mass winter sports event in South Tyrol and the second largest in Italy. The event has never been cancelled (except in 2021 / COVID-19) since the race was first held in 1984, a unique record in Europe. Every year around 2,300 people from over 35 nations take part in the race.

Course 
The loop route from Gsieser Tal to Taisten begins and ends in St. Martin in Gsies (1,220 m a.s.l.). The route distances are 30 km and 42 km for both classic and skating styles, and both races feature a wave-start format. Age-group categories are also awarded. There are 6 points classifications, 3 for the classic races and 3 for the skating races, and all races count towards the Euroloppet Series. The "KIDS Run" is traditionally held on Saturday afternoon.

The Gsieser-Tal-Lauf also includes a non-ranked "Just For Fun" category for non-competitive participants who want to enjoy the special marathon atmosphere.

Taking part 
Skiers aged 16 and over are eligible to take part. For the 42 km race, competitors must be aged 18 or over. Competitors are split into 4 different start waves. Timing is recorded by means of an electronic chip. Each participant receives a certificate of participation and a race medal. Entry fees are staggered, and are based on the date of registration. Online registration begins on 1 June every year.

Winners

Winners skating 42 km

Winners skating 30 km

Winners classic 42 km

Winners classic 30 km

External links 
 Valcasies.com
 Winners Gsieser Tal-Lauf

Cross-country skiing competitions in Italy
1984 establishments in Italy
Sport in South Tyrol
International sports competitions hosted by Italy